Sree Vana Sastha Sree Vana Durga Temple, Ithiyapuram Kaavu, Swamiyar madam.

Sree Vana Sastha Sree Vana Durga Temple, Ithiyapuram Kaavu, Swamiyarmadam. 
Sree Vana Sastha Sree Vana Durga Temple, Ithiyapuram Kaavu, Swamiyar madam.

Geography
This ancient temple is situated in the National Highway NH-47 which runs from Kanyakumari to Thiruvananthapuram. It is located about 30 km from Nagercoil and about 52 km from Thiruvananthapuram and is on the Swamiyarmadam-Verkilambi road, near the Kovikal Bridge.

Its exact age is unknown. However, its age should be greater than an eon.

In this temple the prime god is Sree Vana Sastha and the prime goddess is Sree Vana Durga. The gods Bala Ganapati, Nagaraja, Naga Yakshi, Naga Kanni, Sree Krishna, Sree Eeshvarakala Boothathaan are also available. In this shrine Sree Vana Sastha, Sree Vana Durga and Bala Ganapathy gods are self-manifested. There, in this shrine, Goddess Sree Vana Durga is in the state of Penance, and God Sree Bala Ganapathy is regaining his original form on his own day by day.

There are golden-colored snakes, white colored snakes and King Cobras are in the forest which is in the back side of this temple and many have witnessed it long time ago. The gigantic trees which are surrounding the temple is a vital sign for this temple's eon. And no one is permitted to go into the forest area which is behind the temple.

History
Long ago, Travancore King Marthanda Varma ran via this place to save his life and after becoming the King he handedover a copper record of legal documents as a gift to this temple and was said by the people during his period.
There was no one to maintain this temple for a long period and was lying dilapidated. In the reason past this temple was well maintained because of the action taken by the local public and regular workshops are taking place. During every Pankuni Uthram a festival of five days is grandly celebrated in this temple. In the month of Karthigai Mandala Pooja of 41 days, Powrnami Pooja, Aayilya Pooja are also taking place. During every evenings Santhya Pooja is taking place as a Nithya Pooja.

It is believed that Goddess Sree Vana Durga came all the way from the dense jungle of Pechiparai and in protection to her God Sree Vana Sastha and snakes troops came there to this place. During every powrnami days one could have a dharshan of Nager without fail.

References

External links
 
 http://ithiyapuramkaavu.in/

Gallery 

Fertility gods
Hindu gods
Hindu temples in Kanyakumari district
Regional Hindu gods
Devi temples in India